Herbert Müller may refer to:

Herbert Müller (handball coach) (born 1962), Romanian-born German handball coach and former handball player
Herbert Müller (racing driver) (1940–1981), racing driver from Switzerland
Herbert Müller (field hockey) (1904–1966), German field hockey player
Herbert Muller (cyclist) (1914–1999), Belgian cyclist
Herbert J. Muller (1905–1980), American historian, academic, government official and author